Angelina Carreño Mijares (born 25 December 1981) is a Mexican politician affiliated with Mexico's Institutional Revolutionary Party (PRI). She currently serves as Deputy of the LXII Legislature of the Mexican Congress representing the Mexico State.

References

1981 births
Living people
People from Mexico City
Women members of the Chamber of Deputies (Mexico)
Members of the Chamber of Deputies (Mexico)
Institutional Revolutionary Party politicians
21st-century Mexican politicians
21st-century Mexican women politicians
Deputies of the LXII Legislature of Mexico